General Ion-Aurel Stanciu (born March 27, 1955, in Buzău) was the chief of the Romanian Air Force Staff from 17 February 2009 to 7 January 2011. He graduated the Aurel Vlaicu Flight School in 1977 and the Carol I National Defence University in 1986. He assumed office following the discharge of Lieutenant General Constantin Croitoru. He was previously manager of Romavia airlines, and deputy commander of Henri Coandă International Airport.
On 7 January 2011 he was discharged from active duty and promoted to the rank of General.

Rank promotion
1977 – Lieutenant;
1981 – Lieutenant-Major;
1986 – Captain;
1990 – Major;
1993 – Commanding-captain;
1998 – Commander;
2004 – General de flotilă aeriană;
2008 – Major-General.
2010 – Lieutenant-General.
2011 – General.

References

External links
Ion-Aurel Stancu on Romanian Air Force official website

|-

1955 births
Living people
People from Buzău
Romanian Air Force generals
Carol I National Defence University alumni